A Macquarium is an aquarium made to sit within the shell of an Apple Macintosh computer. The term was coined by computer writer Andy Ihnatko as a joke (a jibe at then outdated Macintosh 512K) but Macquariums have since been built both by Ihnatko himself and by others.

Ihnatko originally designed his Macquarium to use the Compact Macintosh-style shell. In the early 1990s several Mac models in this form factor (the Macintosh 128K, Macintosh 512K and Macintosh Plus) were becoming obsolete, and Ihnatko considered that turning one into an aquarium might be "the final upgrade" — as well as an affordable way to have a color Compact Mac. He has mentioned in interviews that he had seen previous, over-complex attempts at Macintosh aquariums at trade shows that among other drawbacks suffered from noticeable water level lines across the "screen" that spoiled the illusion of a "really good screensaver", which drove him to design a version without a visible water line and which allowed the external case of the donor Mac to remain intact.

Ihnatko's slant-front tank design, made of glass, had a nominal capacity of approximately 10 liters (2.2 UK gallons or 2.5 US gallons). Some subsequent designs have utilized acrylic glass or lexan. Because of its small capacity relative to most other aquariums, the Macquarium is considered a form of pico aquarium, which requires a higher level of diligence to maintain proper water chemistry and cleanliness. 

Some of the Macquariums built by others on an individual basis, the versions that Ihnatko refers to as "overly complex", were constructed with parts from two sources located closer to Apple headquarters a 1 Infinite Loop on De Anza Blvd in Cupertino, CA. Across the street from each other was the Tropical Fish Factory and a retail location for Tap Plastics, a supplier of scrap and custom acrylic plastic. The Tropical Fish Factory was one of Northern California's largest aquarium products and live fish retailers. Both businesses are now gone, but their impact on Macquariums will remain. How these Macquariums differed is that the actual Macintosh shell was the aquarium where vent holes and the screen was sealed so that it could hold water.

Macquariums are often stocked with 2-3 goldfish which do not require tank heaters and are cheap. But because goldfish grow large, have high oxygen requirements and are messy eaters they require much larger tanks for survival, Siamese fighting fish and small shrimp are better options.

Other Mac models have similarly been made into aquariums such as the iMac, Macintosh TV, the Apple Lisa and the Power Mac G4 Cube. Various iMac models have been used to make "iMacquariums". By 1995, a Macquarium based on a Macintosh LC 575 appeared in a Macintosh magazine titled "Macquarium '95".

The term "Macquarium" as it refers to the Macintosh-based aquarium is unrelated to the Atlanta, Georgia, user experience firm Macquarium Intelligent Communications.

Footnotes

External links
 iMacquariums built out of G3 iMacs
 Guide to MacQuarium construction, setup, and upkeep
 Andy Ihnatko's original instructions for a Classic form Mac:
 Macquarium construction diary with photos and tips

Aquariums
Fishkeeping
Macintosh platform